Opus de Jazz (subtitled A Hi-Fi Recording for Flute, Vibes, Piano, Bass, Drums) is an album by American jazz vibraphonist Milt Jackson featuring performances recorded in 1955 and released on the Savoy label.

Reception
The AllMusic review by Scott Yanow stated: "This is not essential, but it is enjoyable music."

Track listing
 "Opus de Funk" (Horace Silver) – 13:28 
 "Opus Pocus" (Ozzie Cadena) – 7:25 
 "You Leave Me Breathless" (Ralph Freed, Frederick Hollander) – 6:27 
 "Opus and Interlude" (Cadena) – 6:30 
Recorded in New York City on October 28, 1955

Personnel
Milt Jackson – vibes
Frank Wess – tenor saxophone, track 2; flute, tracks 1, 3 and 4
Hank Jones – piano
Eddie Jones – bass
Kenny Clarke – drums

References 

Savoy Records albums
Milt Jackson albums
1956 albums